Abdellah Khafifi (born 19 February 1993) is a Moroccan professional footballer who plays as a defender for Umm Salal.

Khafifi has spent his entire senior career with Mouloudia Oujda, having signed with their senior team in 2017, and is currently the captain of the side.

References

External links
 
 

1993 births
Living people
People from Oujda
Moroccan footballers
Moroccan expatriate footballers
MC Oujda players
Umm Salal SC players
Botola players
Qatar Stars League players
Association football defenders
Expatriate footballers in Qatar
Moroccan expatriate sportspeople in Qatar
2020 African Nations Championship players
Morocco A' international footballers